NICC is Northeast Iowa Community College.

NICC may also refer to:
National Intelligence Coordination Center, a center established by US Director of National Intelligence
Nebraska Indian Community College
Noor Islamic Cultural Center, a mosque in Columbus, Ohio
Northern Ireland Constitutional Convention
National Interagency Coordination Center, a tenant of the US National Interagency Fire Center
National Interfaith Cable Coalition, the founder of Vision Interfaith Satellite Network in 1987 
, Belgian government agency
6-hydroxynicotinate 3-monooxygenase, an enzyme